Lasiothyris subsorbia is a species of moth of the family Tortricidae. It is found in Cuba.

The wingspan is about 10 mm. The ground colour of the forewings is ochreous cream with slight ferruginous suffusions and somewhat darker strigulation (fine streaks). The markings are ferruginous. The hindwings are whitish, mixed with some brownish on the periphery.

Etymology
The species name refers to similarity with Lasiothyris sorbia and is derived from the name of this species plus the Latin prefix sub (meaning beneath).

References

Moths described in 2007
Cochylini
Endemic fauna of Cuba